The Arcade Hotel was a registered historic building in Springfield, Ohio, United States.  It was listed on the National Register of Historic Places in 1974.  Since that time, the historic structure has been demolished, and a Courtyard by Marriott erected in its place.

Historic uses 

Hotel
Business
Manufacturing Facility
US Post Office
Railroad Station

References 

National Register of Historic Places in Clark County, Ohio
Hotel buildings on the National Register of Historic Places in Ohio
Buildings and structures in Springfield, Ohio